BBK Electronics Corporation is a Chinese multinational conglomerate. The company specializes in developing consumer electronics products such as smartphones, tablet computers, smartwatches, smart TVs, Hi-Fi equipment, Blu-ray players, and digital cameras. It is one of the world's largest smartphone manufacturers.

History
Guangdong BBK Electronics Corporation limited was established on 18 September 1995, in Dongguan, Guangdong, China. Duan Yongping founded the company, but began "spinning off the company's divisions into individual entities in 1999."

BBK Electronics Corporation is the parent company of Oppo and Vivo. Oppo's subsidiaries include OnePlus. Vivo's subsidiaries include iQOO (a former sub-brand of Vivo). It also markets Blu-ray players, headphones, headphone amplifiers and smartwatches under Oppo Digital brand. In March 2019, BBK Electronics announced imoo as its newest member and also a performance sub-brand.

BBK Electronics' headquarters and production base are located in Chang'an, Dongguan. It is the biggest taxpayer in Chang'an.

In Q1 2017, BBK Electronics shipped 56.7 million smartphones, surpassing both Huawei and Apple to become the 2nd largest smartphone manufacturer in the world, just behind Samsung.

In 2020, the BBK series represented by Oppo announced its involvement in independent research and development of chips. Vivo also followed up to manufacture chips, mainly in cooperation with MediaTek.

As of October 2022, BBK Electronics' Chinese-market website redirects to its subsidiary, Guangdong Little Genius Limited Technology Corporation, a manufacturer of smartwatches marketed for children.

Notes

References

External links
BBK Electronics 

 
Companies based in Dongguan
Electronics companies established in 1995
Chinese companies established in 1995
Electronics companies of China
Mobile phone companies of China
Home appliance manufacturers of China
Mobile phone manufacturers
Chinese brands
Privately held companies of China
1995 establishments in China
Manufacturing companies of China
Telecommunications equipment vendors
Telecommunication equipment companies of China
Multinational companies headquartered in China